Treasures Untold is the title of a live recording by Doc Watson & Family, recorded at the 1964 Newport Folk Festival. It includes four duets with Clarence White. Watson's son, Merle, was 15 years old at the time of the recording. He later performed numerous concerts and on recordings with his father.

It was released on CD in 1991 by Vanguard.

Reception

Writing for Allmusic, music critic Thom Owen wrote the album "At the concert, Doc Watson and his family were in fine form, breathing life into a number of old-timey songs, ranging from ballads to folk songs to gospel. It's an exciting, affectionate performance, highlighted by four duets with Clarence White."

Track listing
All tracks Traditional unless otherwise noted.
 "Introduction" – 3:16
 "Lights in the Valley" – 3:49
 "Beaumont Rag" – 1:23
 "I Heard My Mother Weeping" – 3:31
 "Billy in the Low Ground" – 1:36
 "Omie Wise" – 4:20
 "Reuben's Train" – 2:49
 "Hicks' Farewell" – 4:00
 "Rambling Hobo" – 1:41
 "White House Blues" – 1:38
 "Jimmy Sutton/The Old Buck Ram" –  :58
 "I Want to Love Him More" – 2:35
 "Grandfather's Clock" (Henry Clay Work) – 1:39
 "Chinese Breakdown" – 1:08
 "Handsome Molly" – 2:21
Duets with Clarence White:
 "Beaumont Rag" – 1:58
 "Farewell Blues" – 1:59
 "Lonesome Road Blues" – 1:16
 "Footprints in the Snow" – 2:13

Personnel
Doc Watson – guitar, banjo, harmonica, autoharp, vocals
Gaither Carlton – banjo, fiddle, flute, vocals
Arnold Watson – banjo, vocals
Clarence White - guitar
Merle Watson – guitar
Mrs. General Dixon Watson – vocals
Rosa Lee Watson – vocals
Production notes
Mary Katherine Aldin – liner notes, compilation producer
Georgette Cartwright – pre-production coordinator
Kent Crawford – compilation executive producer
Al Maxwell – photography
Susanne Smolka – design
Captain Jeff Zaraya – mixing, compilation engineer

References

1964 live albums
Doc Watson live albums
Vanguard Records live albums